The Douglas Ferreira is a diesel-hydraulic 15" gauge locomotive which was built in 2005 by TMA Engineering and works on the Ravenglass & Eskdale Railway in Cumbria, England. Its wheel configuration is B-B and it is named after the former General Manager of the railway from 1961 until 1994, Douglas Ferreira.

It is owned and was designed by a working group from the Ravenglass & Eskdale Railway Preservation Society and now works passenger trains almost every day that they are scheduled, specifically the off-peak trains during the summer months and the vast majority of service trains throughout the winter. In 2006 it worked 9230 miles on the railway and in 2007 it travelled 8958 miles between Ravenglass and Dalegarth.

The locomotive carries the Indian Red livery of the Furness Railway, which worked on the Cumbrian Coast Line until 1922, with the White and Red lining of the T & J Harrison Shipping Line (Ferreira's first employer), colloquially known as "Two of Fat and One of Lean", at the top of the body on the engine house and cab sides. The Indian Red is identical to that used on River Mite, the steam locomotive owned by the R&ER Preservation Society. It uses a Westinghouse air brake system which is combined to provide a singular train brake and locomotive brake operation, however the locomotive also has a separate parking brake. It is noted for also using very bright aircraft landing lights as headlights at either end.

A development of the similar Lady Wakefield locomotive, built by the railway in 1980 and the John Southland and Captain Howey locomotives built by TMA Engineering for the Romney, Hythe & Dymchurch Railway, the locomotive upholds a high miles-per-casualty ratio, making it an invaluable asset to the railway.

In September 2008 the locomotive made its first visit to another 15" gauge line, in this case, the Bure Valley Railway's Super Power event. The locomotive suffered a catastrophic power unit failure in April 2013 and was dispatched to TMA Engineering for a replacement to be fitted. At the time, the railway was already struggling for operational motive power, due to the major fire in the engineering workshops and unavailability of steam locomotives. 1929-vintage Perkins stepped up as the only available diesel locomotive available for passenger service, as Lady Wakefield was also receiving a new power unit in Birmingham, while Shelagh of Eskdale has been out of service for several years. As of May 2013, the locomotive is at TMA's workshops in Birmingham.

See also 
Ravenglass and Eskdale Railway locomotives

Ravenglass and Eskdale Railway locomotives